There are a number of phrases that refer to Dutch people, or originate from the Netherlands.

List 
 Dutch uncle
 Double Dutch (jump rope)
 Going Dutch
 Dutch courage
 Dutch Sandwich

Further reading 

 

Dutch culture
Lists of phrases